David Donald O'Malley (November 12, 1912 – October 7, 1986) was a member of the Wisconsin State Assembly.

Biography
O'Malley was born on November 12, 1912 in Waunakee, Wisconsin. He attended the University of Wisconsin-Madison and was a member of the Knights of Columbus. He died of a heart attack in 1986.

Career
O'Malley was elected to the Assembly in 1958 and served until 1977. He was succeeded by Thomas A. Loftus. In addition, he was supervisor of Waunakee and a member of the Dane County Board. He was a Democrat.

References

People from Waunakee, Wisconsin
University of Wisconsin–Madison alumni
1912 births
1986 deaths
20th-century American politicians
Democratic Party members of the Wisconsin State Assembly